Cheongju National College of Science and Technology was a public technical college in South Korea. In 2006 it amalgamated with Chungju National University which later merged with Korea National Railroad College into Korea National University of Transportation in 2012.  

The main campus is situated in Cheongju, which is the capital of North Chungcheong province. A satellite campus is located in Jeungpyeong County. The college employed about 60 professors.

Academics
The school's offerings, loan modification which are entirely at the undergraduate level, are arranged under four divisions:  Nursing and Health, Social Work, Industry, and Arts.

History
The school was first founded in the early years of Japanese occupation.  It was opened by the occupation government in April 1914, as the Cheongju Jahye Hospital Nursing and Infant Care Training Facility (청주 자혜의원 조산부 및 간호부 양성소), attached to Jahye Hospital.   It was reorganized as a provincial three-year technical high school in 1948, continuing its emphasis on nursing and child care.  It became a technical college in 1979, and its management was transferred from provincial to national authorities in 1983.

See also
List of colleges and universities in South Korea
Education in South Korea

External links
Official school website, in Korean

Universities and colleges in North Chungcheong Province
1914 establishments in Korea
Educational institutions established in 1914
Defunct universities and colleges in South Korea